A. L. Srinivasan (23 November 1923 – 30 July 1977) was a Tamil film producer who is known for having introduced many directors in Tamil cinema.

Early life
Srinivasan was the sixth child in a family of children. Kannappa Chettiar, Gandhimathi, Muthammal, Gnanaambal, Sswarnammaal, Kannadasan and Sivakami are the siblings of Srinivasan.

Career 
Starting his career as a financier, Srinivasan slowly graduated to become a distributor and producer. He also owned film studios in Madras and Coimbatore. As a producer, he is credited for having introduced directors such as A. Bhimsingh, Puttanna Kanagal, K. S. Gopalakrishnan, Aroor Dhas, Script writer and P. Madhavan.

Srinivasan was the president of the South Indian Film Chamber of Commerce for 13 years. He can be credited with introducing many people to the film industry through his films (35 in total) in five Indian languages – Tamil, Telugu, Hindi, Malayalam, and Kannada.

Personal life 
Srinivasan had two children, Kannappan and Visalakshi with his first wife Azhagammai Aachi (died on 21 May 1981).

Death 
Srinivasan had diabetes and died on 30 July 1977 following a heart attack.

Filmography

As producer 

 Thirudaathae
 Panam
 Ambikapathy
 Lakshmi Kalyanam
 Kandan Karunai
 Cinema Paiththiyam

Awards and honours
 1962 – Jury, International Documentary and Short Film section, 12th Berlin International Film Festival
 1962 – Certificate of Merit for the Third Best Feature Film, Sarada (producer)

References

Tamil film producers
People from Sivaganga district
Place of birth missing
Film producers from Tamil Nadu
20th-century Indian businesspeople
1923 births
1977 deaths